John Alcorn may refer to:

John Alcorn (singer), Canadian jazz singer
John Alcorn (racing driver) (born 1964), retired British race car driver
John Alcorn (artist) (1935–1992), American visual artist